Best & Less is an Australian retailer of clothing and household linens. As of 2020, Best&Less has 246 stores as well as an online platform.

History
Best & Less was founded by Berel Ginges in January 1965, by occupying part of the ground floor of the department store "Snows" which was in the process of closing down. Prior to trading as Best & Less, the store was known as "Shenows". Best & Less officially opened their first store in Parramatta on 27 May 1965.

Best & Less was known for its frugal in-store appearance, with minimal fixtures, and its advertising tagline was "You don't pay for any fancy overheads". The ads often featured Joy Muir, then president of the Australian Housewives' Association, delivering the line to cameras.

In December 2019, Allegro Funds acquired Best & Less from Greenlit Brands. Throughout Australia they now have over 180 stores. Best & Less Group was floated on the Australian Securities Exchange in July 2021 under the code BST.

References

External links
Company website

Clothing retailers of Australia
Companies based in Sydney
Companies listed on the Australian Securities Exchange
Retail companies established in 1965
1965 establishments in Australia